Scott Ramsay is an American operatic tenor who has performed with many of the world's best opera companies and orchestras. His opera credits include performances with the Dublin International Opera Festival, the Lyric Opera of Chicago, Opera Grand Rapids, Syracuse Opera, San Francisco Opera, Opera New Jersey, Dayton Opera, Opera Boston, Opera Naples and Arizona Opera among others. His concert work includes performances with the Albany Symphony Orchestra, Toronto Symphony Orchestra, the Pacific Symphony, the Jacksonville Symphony, the American Symphony Orchestra, and the St. Louis Symphony Orchestra among others. Ramsay has also performed at several notable music festivals including the Berkshire Choral Festival, the Sugar Creek Festival, and the Ravinia Festival.

References

External links
 Profile, Mirshak Artists Management

American operatic tenors
Living people
Year of birth missing (living people)
Place of birth missing (living people)